NYC Prep is an American reality television series on  Bravo. The series debuted on June 23, 2009. The series follows six Manhattan teenagers in their daily lives as they attended events such as weekend parties, fashion shows, shopping sprees, charity events and dinner parties. The series drew many comparisons to the hit CW television show Gossip Girl because both shows revolved around the lives of Manhattan's "elite" teenagers. Filming was not allowed during school, nor were any school names specifically mentioned on the show, as the schools desired to distance themselves from the show.

Cast

Camille Isobel Hughes
Camille Isobel Hughes is a student at the Professional Children's School. She was previously a student at the Nightingale-Bamford School. However, Camille decided to attend The College of William & Mary in the fall of 2010 to join the class of 2014. Only her math SAT score was released from her blog; she answered two questions incorrectly on the math portion. Camille has a younger sister, Lillie. Hughes is a member of the Delta Delta Delta sorority. She publicly identifies her involvement in NYC Prep on her Twitter account.

Jessica "Jessie" Leavitt
Jessica Leavitt is a graduate of the Dwight School on the Upper West Side of New York City. She enrolled in the Fashion Institute of Technology in fall 2009.

Kelli Brooke Tomashoff
Kelli Brooke Tomashoff is a student at the Birch Wathen Lenox School on the Upper East Side of New York City.  She is a member of the school's class of 2010. Kelli's parents live in The Hamptons, while Kelli and her older brother share an apartment.  Kelli's mother is a realtor. Her father is the owner of a printing company.

Sebastian Oppenheim
Sebastian Oppenheim is a student at Ross School, a private school in East Hampton, New York.  His father is Jeff Oppenheim, a theater and film director, producer and writer. His mother is Djida Oppenheim. He has a sister, Stephanie.  Sebastian is a member of the school's class of 2011, and he attended the College of Charleston after graduation. He majored in International Relations with a concentration in Africa and graduated in the spring of 2015.

Taylor DiGiovanni
Taylor DiGiovanni is a student who previously attended Stuyvesant High School, a public high school in Battery Park City, New York. Taylor is a member of the school's class of 2011. She later attended City-As-School in New York City.

Peter Cary "PC" Peterson
Peter Cary "PC" Peterson is a resident of the Upper West Side in New York City.  Although the show chronicles his life on the Upper East Side, PC resides on the Upper West Side with his mother.  He attended the Dwight School on the Upper West Side as well, and went on to enroll at Rollins College. He is the grandson of billionaire and former US Secretary of Commerce Peter George Peterson. His step-grandmother Joan Ganz Cooney created Sesame Street. PC's mother is Paige Peterson, a noted painter and writer. His father is David Peterson. PC's parents are divorced.

Episodes

Critical reception
Metacritic gave the show a Metascore of 42 based on 8 critical reviews, indicating mixed to average reviews. Jezebel's Margaret Hartmann found the show "tame" comparatively to Gossip Girl, "Though each of the cast members fits an obvious Gossip Girl stereotype, real teens can't be shown having sex or taking drugs. Los Angeles Times noted "Chuck and Blair may be prone to saying things like "That's what New York is: Money is power" and "I treat my clothing like children," but somehow the charm is lost when it's coming out of real teenagers' mouths." Salon.com described NYC Prep as "the reality version" of "Gossip Girl" for those who take "Gossip Girl" a little too seriously—and don't mind that real prep school kids are far less witty and fascinating than the scripted ones." Brian Lowry from Variety criticized the fact that parents are about as present as those in the Charlie Brown cartoons and said the main problem is that "the show never gets better than its title -- lacking the sociological insight to score as a documentary or the hyper-real situations and "characters" that would make it sizzle as a soap."

However, Anne Becker from The Daily Beast said "NYC Prep trumps its scripted predecessor, Gossip Girl, in terms of quality guilty-viewing pleasure. Despite its flagging ratings, the series is actually more entertaining than the show from which it was born."  New York Daily Newss David Hinckley gave the show a 3 stars rating out of 5, writing, "underneath, we also see kids. Yes, rich kids, but also insecure kids coping with the universal dramas of teenagers. That may be the most engaging part of "NYC Prep.""

Dorothy Hutcheson, head of Nightingale-Bamford School, sent a letter home to all Nightingale parents, warning them about the show and the potentially negative portrayal of the school on the show.

References

External links
 
 

2000s American reality television series
2009 American television series debuts
2009 American television series endings
Bravo (American TV network) original programming
English-language television shows
Television shows set in New York City